{{Automatic_taxobox
| image = Nepytia umbrosaria.jpg
| image_caption = Nepytia umbrosaria
| taxon = Nepytia
| authority = Hulst, 1896
}}Nepytia' is a genus of moths in the family Geometridae first described by George Duryea Hulst in 1896.

Species
 Nepytia canosaria (Walker, 1863) - false hemlock looper
 Nepytia disputata McDunnough, 1940
 Nepytia freemani Munroe, 1963 - western false hemlock looper
 Nepytia janetae Rindge, 1967
 Nepytia juabata Cassino & Swett, 1922
 Nepytia lagunata Cassino & Swett, 1923
 Nepytia mariaria (Schaus, 1923)
 Nepytia pellucidaria (Packard, 1873) - false pine looper
 Nepytia phantasmaria (Strecker, 1899)
 Nepytia regulata Barnes & McDunnough, 1916
 Nepytia semiclusaria (Walker, 1863)
 Nepytia swetti Barnes & Benjamin, 1923
 Nepytia umbrosaria'' (Packard, 1873)

References

Ourapterygini